Lagonglong, officially the Municipality of Lagonglong, is a 5th class municipality in the province of Misamis Oriental, Philippines. According to the 2020 census, it has a population of 24,190 people.

Geography

Barangays
Lagonglong is politically subdivided into 10 barangays.
 Banglay
 Dampil
 Gaston
 Kabulawan
 Kauswagan
 Lumbo
 Manaol
 Poblacion
 Tabok
 Umagos

Climate

Demographics

Economy

References

External links
 [ Philippine Standard Geographic Code]
Philippine Census Information
Local Governance Performance Management System

Municipalities of Misamis Oriental